Kerry Gruenhagen (born c. 1970) is an American farmer and politician.

Early life and career
Gruenhagen is a resident of Walcott, Iowa, and became a member of the Muscatine County branch of the Farm Bureau in 1994.

Political career
Gruenhagen announced his intention to run for District 41 of the Iowa Senate in December 2021. The seat was open following redistricting, as Jim Lykam retired and Roby Smith opted to run for state treasurer. Gruenhagen defeated Alan Weets in the Republican Party primary election, held in June 2022. Gruenhagen won the November 2022 general election against Democratic candidate Deb VanderGaast.

References

Republican Party Iowa state senators
21st-century American politicians
Farmers from Iowa
People from Muscatine County, Iowa
Living people
1970s births